Cheyenne Rosenthal (born 23 July 2000) is a German luger. She is the 2019 Junior World champion, 2018 Junior European champion and the overall winner of the 2017/18 Junior World Cup. She made her Luge World Cup debut in 2019/20 season, and reached her first World Cup podium at the sprint race in Whistler Sliding Centre by finishing in third-place.

Luge results
All results are sourced from the International Luge Federation (FIL) and German Bobsleigh, Luge and Skeleton Federation (BSD).

World Championships

World Cup

Singles 

Note: To be classified in Sprint World Cup standings athletes must compete on all sprint events throughout the season.

Doubles

European Championships
 2020 Lillehammer – 19th in Singles (9th in U23 category)

U23 World Championships
 2020 Sochi –  in Singles

Junior World Championships
 2017 Sigulda – 10th in Singles
 2018 Altenberg – 11th in Singles
 2019 Innsbruck –  in Singles,  in Team relay

Junior European Championships
 2017 Oberhof –  in Singles
 2018 Winterberg –  in Singles,  in Team relay
 2019 St. Moritz – 7th in Singles

German Championships
 2018 Winterberg – 7th in Singles
 2019 Oberhof – 4th in Singles

References

External links

Cheyenne Rosenthal at the German Bobsleigh, Luge, and Skeleton Federation 

2000 births
Living people
German female lugers
21st-century German women